The Dhaka Metropolitan Police (DMP) is the unit of Bangladesh Police responsible for law enforcement in the metropolis of Dhaka, the national capital and most populous city in Bangladesh. The DMP is the largest police force unit in Bangladesh. At present the DMP commissioner is Md. Khandker Golam Faruq BPM (Bar), PPM.

History
During a major reorganization and expansion of Bangladesh's national police forces, the Dhaka Metropolitan Police (DMP) was established on 1 February 1976 to maintain law and order in the country's capital and largest city. It initially had 6,000 personnel in 12 police stations. With the rapid population growth of the city, the need of an expanded and better equipped police increased. The government planned a major expansion of police. Consequently, the establishment of 50 police stations has been completed. The number of personnel has been expanded, with newer ranks and officer corps.

Organisation 
The current total strength of stands at around more than 34,000 (including ministerial staff) personnel and 50 police stations. The DMP organisation is divided into 42 divisions headed by five additional commissioners aided by joint commissioners, deputy commissioners, additional deputy commissioners and assistant commissioners. Here is the DMP organogram in brief:

 Headquarters and Administration: Additional Commissioner (Admin) administers the Dhaka Metropolitan Police Headquarters. Joint Commissioner (Headquarters) assists him in this regard. Joint Commissioner (Public Order Management) helps him with his 10,500 officers by governing arms of the police, handling appointments, training, logistics, supplies and other administrative functions. Additional Commissioner (Admin) has 15 divisions under his supervision.
 Crime and Operations Additional Commissioner (Crime & Ops) administers and oversees the functions of all the city police stations. Joint Commissioner (Crime) and Joint Commissioner (Ops) assist him in managing the crime divisions. Joint Commissioner (Protection) is responsible for providing security to VIPs, members of parliament, government officials, foreign dignitaries and others. Additional Commissioner (Crime & Ops) has 14 divisions under his supervision.
 Detective and Criminal Intelligence: Additional Commissioner (Detective and Criminal Intelligence Division) is responsible for fighting organised crime, homicide, theft, drug trafficking, crimes against women and human trafficking. He has 9 divisions under his supervision.
 Traffic: Additional Commissioner (Traffic) is responsible for serving as the traffic police of the city, regulating vehicular traffic, speed and parking laws, pedestrian and road security. Eight divisions are under his supervision.
 Counter Terrorism and Transnational Crime is a specialized branch of Dhaka Metropolitan Police comprising 600 officers, formed in 2016, to tackle terrorism and transnational crime. There are seven divisions are under his supervision.

SWAT
The SWAT (Special Weapons And Tactics) is another elite tactical unit of the Dhaka Metropolitan Police which was established on 28 February 2009. SWAT is operated under the Special Action Group of Counter Terrorism and Transnational Crime of Dhaka Metropolitan Police.

Cyber Crime Investigation Division
The Cyber Security & Crime Division, more commonly known as the Cyber Crime Division, is a branch of Bangladesh Police which is operated under the Counter Terrorism and Transnational Crime of Dhaka Metropolitan Police.

SWPC
Female officers were first inducted into the DMP in 1978.

The Special Women Police Contingent (SWPC) of the Dhaka Metropolitan Police was created in 2008 to specifically track  female criminals involved in activities such as prostitution, drug smuggling and human trafficking, theft, homicide and swindling.
 With increasing proportions of female criminals in Bangladesh, the SWPC, composing entirely of female officers, would be used to gather intelligence that men are seen as less capable of gathering.

The Special Women Police Contingent (SWPC) was formed in 2008 with the intention of developing a special unit consisting only of women that would investigate crimes involving female criminals. Bangladesh Narcotics Control Department reported that as many as 100,000 people were engaged in drug trafficking, of whom 40 percent were women. Bangladesh Police considered male officers to be less effective than women in gathering information and investigating crimes involving women and had already been using female police officers more in tackling crimes involving female criminals. As an all-women force, the SWPC is the first of its kind in Bangladesh's history.

Bangladesh Police plan to raise such units across the country. Currently, there are roughly 2,000 women officers in Bangladesh Police - less than two percent of the total force and one-third of whom are deployed in Dhaka. Bangladesh Police plan to train and hire 3,000 women officers to bolster the SWPC. An Assistant Commissioner of Police in charge of the Dhaka SWPC who leads a detective force of 24 women officers.

Thana list of Dhaka Metropolitan Police 

Adabor
Airport
Badda
Banani
Bangshal
Bhashantek
Cantonment
Chackbazar
Dakshin Khan
Darus-Salam
Demra
Dhanmondi
Gandaria
Gulshan
Hatirjheel
Hazaribagh
Jattrabari
Kadamtoli
Kafrul
Kalabagan
Kamrangirchar
Khilgaon
Khilkhet
Kotwali
Lalbagh
Mirpur Model
Mohammadpur
Motijheel
Mugda
New Market
Pallabi
Paltan Model
Ramna Model
Rampura
Rupnagar
Sabujbag
Shah Ali
Shahbag
Shahjahanpur
Sher e Bangla Nagar
Shyampur
Sutrapur
Tejgaon
Tejgaon Industrial
Turag
Uttar Khan
Uttara East
Uttara West
Vatara
Wari

The DMP also collaborates and maintains organizational links with the Bangladesh Ansar, Border Guard Bangladesh, Special Branch, Bangladeshi intelligence community, Rapid Action Battalion and other national security agencies.

Controversies 

 Mahbubur Rahman Sujon, a small trader, was arrested by sub-inspector Jahidur Rahman of Mirpur police station. He was killed in custody in July 2014. SI Jahidur, who was previously stationed in Pallabi area, was also involved in the custody death of Jony, arrested from a Mirpur Bihari camp. Jahidur was taken into custody as a murder case over the death of Sujon had been filed against him and six other accused in July 2014 after the incident. Sujon's wife had filed the case under Torture and Custodial Death (Protection) Act-2013; the investigation was handed over to Detective Branch. Officer in Charge of Mirpur Station Salahuddin Khan was also accused of being involved by Sujon's wife. Salahuddin Khan was killed in the July 2016 Dhaka attack by terrorists. 
 In March 2014, Jisan, a 17-year-old student, of Dhaka City College was arrested by police from Dhanmondi Police Station. He was allegedly tortured by sub-inspector Sahidul Biswas, who demanded 1 million taka to end the torture. Jisan's father gave 0.4 million taka to plainclothes individuals inside the police station. Jisan had to be admitted to Dhaka Medical College Hospital for his injuries. Dhaka Metropolitan Police denied the allegations of torture.
 In January 2015, three teenagers were killed in police custody in Mirpur police station. The teenagers were handed over to police on accusation of attempted arson during Bangladesh Nationalist Party protests. Police claimed they died from mob beating. This was contradicted by evidence that the teenagers had 56 bullet injuries. 
 On 7 April 2015, Uttara West Police station claimed that they tortured a suspect in custody following directives of senior police officers.
 In November 2016 Dhaka Metropolitan Police asked the Directorate General of Health Services not to release the detailed autopsy report of people killed in Crossfire with police to the press.
 On 3 December 2019, sub-inspector Mostafizur Rahman and 5 other police officers of Uttara west police station were sued at for allegedly extorting a banker of Sonali Bank.
 On 16 January 2014, Tapan Chandra Saha, officer in charge of Uttara west police station was sued for the death of man in custody at the Dhaka Metropolitan Sessions Judge's Court. The deceased's wife alleged that her husband was tortured in custody and she paid 50 thousand taka in bribes. On 24 January 2020, the court ordered Detective Branch to investigate on the incident.
 In 2020, police commissioner Shafiqul Islam removed a loyalist officer of Inspector General of Bangladesh Police Benazir Ahmed after publicly accusing him of corruption.

Police commissioners

References

Law enforcement agencies of Bangladesh
Municipal law enforcement agencies of Bangladesh
Police units of Bangladesh